Kereks (autonym aӈӄalҕakku, angqalghakku, "seaside people") are an ethnic group of people in Russia. In the 2021 census, only 23 people registered as ethnic Kereks in Russia. According to the 2010 census, there were only 4, and according to the 2002 census, there were 8 people registered as Kereks. According to the 1897 census, there were still 102 Kereks. During the twentieth century, Kereks were almost completely assimilated into the Chukchi people.

Language
Their traditional language is the Kerek language, but it is no longer spoken. Kerek descendants speak Chukchi and Russian. The Kerek language, which belongs to the Chukchi–Kamchatka family (it is included in Paleoasiatic languages), is close to the Koryak language and is often considered a dialect of the latter.

Lifestyle
Historically, the Kerek were a settled people who engaged in fishing and hunting of wild deer and mountain sheep. Southern Kereks also practiced small-scale reindeer herding. They also kept sled dogs and collected fur from marine mammals.

Shamanism and animism was strong among the Kerek, with the Kerek never converting to Christianity.

References

Further reading
 Leontev V.V. On the land of ancient Kereks. Magadan: Magadan Book Publishing House, 1976. 260 p.

External links
 The Red Book of the Peoples of the Russian Empire -- Kereks

Indigenous peoples of North Asia
Chukotka Autonomous Okrug
Indigenous small-numbered peoples of the North, Siberia and the Far East